Asia University (AU), formerly Taichung Health and Management College, is a private university in Taichung, Taiwan. Founded in 2001, it offers education for degrees in health and medical science, computer science and electrical engineering, creative design, management, and humanities and social sciences.

The university was founded with the goal of becoming an internationally competitive comprehensive university, and has been growing quickly since its creation. Specifically, being essentially a college with 17 departments and only about 2000 students when established in 2001, it has become a medium-size university with 28 departments and more than 12,000 students in 2018.

History
Asia University (AU), initially with the name of Taichung Healthcare and Management College, was founded in August 2001 in Wufeng, Taichung,(Taiwan) by Chang-Hai Tsai and Tseng-lien Lin. On August 1, 2005, Taichung Healthcare and Management University was renamed "Asia University" under the authority of the Ministry of Education.

Though being the youngest university in Taiwan, by great efforts put in school running in the past 19 years AU has outstanding achievements and so enters the lists of many global university rankings in the world. Specifically, AU has been ranked to be one of the best universities in the world or in Asia by four famous global university rankings: (1) THE: UK Times Higher Education World University Rankings; (2) ARWU: Academic Ranking of World Universities (originally by Shanghai Jiao Tong University); (3) US News: US News & World Report Global University Ranking; (4) QS - Asia: UK QS Global University Rankings in Asia

Faculties

College of Medical and Health Science
Department of Healthcare Administration
Department of Food Nutrition and Health Biotechnology
Department of Biotechnology
Department of Psychology
Department of Nursing
Department of Optometry
Department of Audiology and Speech Pathology
Department of Occupational Therapy
Department of Physical Therapy
Department of Post-Baccalaureate Veterinary Medicine
College of Information and Electrical Engineering
Department of Bioinformatics and Medical Engineering
Department of Computer Science & Information Engineering
Department of M-Commerce and Multimedia Applications
Department of Photonics and Communication Engineering
Department of Information Communication
College of Management
Department of Business Administration
Department of International Business
Department of Leisure and Recreation Management
Department of Accounting and Information Systems
Department of Finance
Department of Financial and Economic Law
College of Humanities and Social Sciences
Department of Foreign Languages and Literature
Department of Social Work
Department of Early Childhood Education
College of Creative Design
Department of Digital Media Design
Department of Visual Communication Design
Department of Creative Product Design
Department of Fashion Design
Department of Interior Design
International Degree Program of Design
Creative Design and Invention Center
College of Nursing
Department of Nursing
Post-Baccalaureate Program in Nursing
College of Artificial Intelligence
Center for Artificial Intelligence
International College
Center for Creative Leadership
Center for International Academic Exchange
Chinese Language Center
Center for the Development of Language Teaching and Research

Partner Institutions

Americas

United States
Case Western Reserve University
Georgia Institute of Technology
Tulane University
Stanford University
University of California, Berkeley
University of California, Irvine
University of South Carolina
University of Texas, Austin

Canada
University of Victoria

Brazil
Universidade Catolica de Brasilia

Malaysia
Universiti Tunku Abdul Rahman

See also

 List of universities in Taiwan

References

2001 establishments in Taiwan
Educational institutions established in 2001
Universities and colleges in Taichung
Universities and colleges in Taiwan
Comprehensive universities in Taiwan